Wesley Vanbelle (born 5 August 1986) is a Belgian professional footballer who plays for Dender as a defender.

Career
Born in Bonheiden, Vanbelle has played for K.V. Mechelen, Beveren, Bornem, FC Eindhoven, Eendracht Aalst, Cercle Brugge, Lommel, KSV Roeselare and Dender.

References

1986 births
Living people
People from Bonheiden
Belgian footballers
K.V. Mechelen players
K.S.K. Beveren players
FC Eindhoven players
S.C. Eendracht Aalst players
Cercle Brugge K.S.V. players
Lommel S.K. players
K.S.V. Roeselare players
F.C.V. Dender E.H. players
Belgian Pro League players
Challenger Pro League players
Belgian Third Division players
Eerste Divisie players
Association football defenders
Belgian expatriate footballers
Belgian expatriate sportspeople in the Netherlands
Expatriate footballers in the Netherlands
Footballers from Antwerp Province